Ana Carolina Vieira is a Brazilian grappler and Brazilian jiu-jitsu practitioner and competitor. A multiple-time World and Brazilian champion in the lower belts divisions, Vieira is a five-time black belt IBJJF World champion, two-time IBJJF Pan Champion, two-time Abu Dhabi World Pro Champion and European champion. She is the founder of Aviv jiu-jitsu.

Biography 
Ana Carolina Vieira was born on 19 November 1993 in Rio de Janeiro, Brazil. She started learning capoeira then Brazilian jiu-jitsu (BJJ) at the age of 14 but quit because of the lack of girls. She chose to return to BJJ at 17 after watching her brother Rodolfo Vieira compete.

She started training under coach Gabriel Marinho winning as a blue belt in 2012 three major competitions: the Abu Dhabi World Pro trials, the World Championship and the Brazilian Nationals. As a member of the Grappling Fight Team, which also included strong female athletes such as Mayssa Bastos, Amanda Monteiro and Thamires Aquino, Vieira began training under head coach Julio César Pereira. Vieira started winning championships at every belt levels.
She was promoted to black belt in June 2016. The following year she became black belt IBJJF World Champion then in 2018 she won both Gi and No Gi Worlds.

Championships and accomplishments 
Main Achievements (black belt level):
 5 x IBJJF World Champion (2022 / 2021 / 2019 / 2018 / 2017)
 2 x IBJJF Pan Champion (2021 / 2019)
 IBJJF European Open Champion (2017)
 3CG Kumite 7 Grand Prix Champion (2020)
 2 x AJP Abu Dhabi World Pro Champion (2018 / 2017)
 2nd place IBJJF World No-Gi Championship (2018)
 2nd place IBJJF Pan Championship (2021)
 2nd place IBJJF Women's Heavyweight Grand Prix (2023)
 3rd place IBJJF World Championship (2022/2019/2018)

Main Achievements (Colored Belts):
 5 x IBJJF World Champion (2016 brown / 2014 purple / 2013 / 2012 blue)
 4 x CBJJ Brazilian Nationals Champion (2016 brown / 2014 purple / 2012 blue)
 UAEJJF Grand Slam, Rio de Janeiro (2016)
 BJJ Brazilian National Team Championship (2012 blue)
 2nd place CBJJ Brazilian Nationals (2014 purple)
 3rd place IBJJF World Championship (2012 blue)
 3rd place CBJJ Brazilian Nationals (2012 blue)

Instructor lineage 
Luis França > Oswaldo Fadda > Monir Salomão > Júlio César Pereira> Ana Carolina Vieira

Personal life 
Vieira is the cofounder with her wife Hall of Famer, 5 x IBJJF World champion and ADCC champion Luanna Alzuguir of Aviv Jiu-Jitsu, and the sister of multiple-time world champion Rodolfo Vieira.

Notes

References 

1993 births
Brazilian practitioners of Brazilian jiu-jitsu
Living people
People awarded a black belt in Brazilian jiu-jitsu
World Brazilian Jiu-Jitsu Championship medalists
Female Brazilian jiu-jitsu practitioners
Brazilian submission wrestlers
World No-Gi Brazilian Jiu-Jitsu Championship medalists
Brazilian jiu-jitsu world champions (women)
LGBT Brazilian jiu-jitsu practitioners
Brazilian LGBT sportspeople